General elections were held in Malawi on 15 June 1999 to elect the President and National Assembly. They were originally scheduled for 25 May, but were postponed twice as a result of requests by the opposition to extend the voter registration period. Both votes were won by the ruling United Democratic Front, who took 93 of the 192 seats in the National Assembly, and whose candidate, Bakili Muluzi, won the presidential election with an absolute majority.

In total, eleven parties contested the elections, with 670 candidates. Voter turnout was 94%.

Results

President

National Assembly
Elections were not held in the Mchinji West constituency on polling day due to the death of a candidate.

References

Presidential elections in Malawi
Elections in Malawi
Malawi
1999 in Malawi
Malawi